Lwówek  ( or Kirschneustadt from 1943-1945) is a town in Nowy Tomyśl County, Greater Poland Voivodeship, Poland, with 2,939 inhabitants (2004).

540 Jews lived in the town in 1871.

Twin towns – sister cities
 Kazlų Rūda, Lithuania

References

Cities and towns in Greater Poland Voivodeship
Nowy Tomyśl County